Acanthocerini is a tribe of leaf-footed bugs in the family Coreidae. There are at least 20 genera and 50 described species in Acanthocerini.

Genera
These 20 genera belong to the tribe Acanthocerini:

 Acanthocerus Palisot de Beauvois, 1818 i c g b
 Athaumastus Mayr, 1865 i c g
 Beutelspacoris Brailovsky, 1987 i c g
 Brulecoris Brailovsky, 2015 i c g
 Camptischium Amyot and Serville, 1843 i c g
 Crinocerus Burmeister, 1835 i c g
 Dalensocoris Brailovsky, 2015 i c g
 Dersagrena Kirkaldy, 1904 i c g
 Elachisme Kirkaldy, 1904 i c g
 Euthochtha Mayr, 1865 i c g b
 Golema Amyot and Serville, 1843 i c g
 Lacrimascellus Brailovsky, 2015 i c g
 Lybindus Stål, 1859 i c g
 Machtima Amyot and Serville, 1843 i c g
 Moronopelios Brailovsky, 1988 i c g
 Rondoneva Brailovsky and Barrera, 2003 i c g
 Sagotylus Mayr, 1865 i c g b
 Schaeferocoris O'Shea, 1980 i c g
 Thlastocoris Mayr, 1866 i c g
 Zoreva Amyot and Serville, 1843 i c g

Data sources: i = ITIS, c = Catalogue of Life, g = GBIF, b = Bugguide.net

References

Further reading

External links

 

 
Articles created by Qbugbot
Coreinae
Hemiptera tribes